Judges of the Family Court of Australia, include the Chief Justice, Deputy Chief Justice, Judges of the Appeal Division, current, and former judges . They include judges who hold a concurrent commission with the Family Court of Western Australia.

References

 
Family Court of Australia
Family Court